Gurbannazar Ashyrov, Gurbannazar Ashirov, or Kurbannazar Ashirov (Гурбанназар Ашыров;  or Гурбанназар Аширов; born 1974), is a Turkmen politician from Ashgabat. He is a deputy chairman of the Cabinet of Ministers of Turkmenistan.

In 1995 he graduated from the Turkmen State University in physics and since August 2005 has been head of the waterways administration.

References
New government of Turkmenistan

1974 births
Living people
People from Ashgabat
Government ministers of Turkmenistan
Turkmen State University alumni
Date of birth missing (living people)